This is a list of topics related to Botswana. Those interested in the subject can monitor changes to the pages by clicking on Related changes in the sidebar.

Botswana 
 Botswana
 Botswana Railways
 Botswana diplomatic missions
 Sankuyo

Buildings and structures in Botswana 
 Morupule Power Station

Airports in Botswana 
 List of airports in Botswana
 Sir Seretse Khama International Airport

Archaeological sites in Botswana 
 Tsodilo

Communications in Botswana 
 Botswana Telecommunications Corporation
 Communications in Botswana
 .bw
 List of people on stamps of Botswana

Newspapers published in Botswana 
 Mmegi
 The Voice
 The Botswana Gazette
 The Patriot

Conservation in Botswana

National parks of Botswana 
 List of national parks of Botswana
 Central Kalahari Game Reserve
 Chobe National Park
 Kgalagadi Transfrontier Park
 Khutse Game Reserve
 Makgadikgadi Pans National Park
 Mokolodi Nature Reserve
 Moremi Wildlife Reserve
 Nxai Pan National Park

Botswana culture 
 Culture of Botswana
 Badimo
 Cuisine of Botswana
 Coat of arms of Botswana
 Fatshe leno la rona
 Flag of Botswana
 The Gods Must Be Crazy
 Presidents' Day (Botswana)
 Public holidays in Botswana
 See also: Sport in Botswana

Languages of Botswana 
   shetapo language
   shekgalagari language
 Ikalanga language
 !Xóõ language
 Bemba language
 G‖ana language
 Herero language
 Ju languages
 Ju/’hoan language
 Lozi language
 Nama language
 Shona language
 Shua language
 Sotho languages
 Tsoa language
 Tswana language
 Tuu languages
 ‖Ani language
 ‡Hõã language
 ‡Kx’au‖’ein language

Botswana music 
 Music of Botswana
 Botswana hip hop
 Tswana music
 Rock and Roll

Government Parastatals 

 Botswana Unified Revenue Service
 Companies and Intellectual Property Authority

Economy of Botswana 
 Economy of Botswana
 Botswana pula
 Debswana

Companies of Botswana 
 See also: Airlines of Botswana
Botswana Telecommunications Corporation
Choppies
Consumer Watchdog
 Coalbed methane
 Customized Software
Impression House
Mascom
 Moikabi Post
Orange Botswana
 RVM Properties
 Thebe Botswana Advertiser

Mines in Botswana 
 Damtshaa diamond mine
 Jwaneng diamond mine
 Letlhakane diamond mine
 Morupule Colliery
 Orapa diamond mine
 BCL Mine
 Tati Nickel Mine

Trade unions of Botswana

Botswana Federation of Trade Unions 
 Air Botswana Employees' Union
 Botswana Agricultural Marketing Board Workers' Union
 Botswana Bank Employees' Union
 Botswana Beverages & Allied Workers' Union
 Botswana Central Bank Staff Union
 Botswana Commercial & General Workers' Union
 Botswana Construction Workers' Union
 Botswana Diamond Sorters & Valuators' Union
 Botswana Federation of Trade Unions
 Botswana Hotel Travel & Tourism Workers' Union
 Botswana Housing Corporation Staff Union
 Botswana Institute of Development Management Workers' Union
 Botswana Manufacturing & Packaging Workers' Union
 Botswana Meat Industry Workers' Union
 Botswana Mining Workers' Union
 Botswana National Development Bank Staff Union
 Botswana Postal Services Workers' Union
 Botswana Power Corporation Workers' Union
 Botswana Private Medical & Health Services Workers' Union
 Botswana Railways Amalgamated Workers' Union
 Botswana Saving Bank Employees' Union
 Botswana Telecommunication Employees' Union
 Botswana Vaccine Institute Staff Union
 Botswana Wholesale, Furniture & Retail Workers' Union
 National Amalgamated Central, Local & Parastatal Manual Workers' Union
 Rural Industry Promotions Company Workers' Union
 University of Botswana Non-Academic Staff Union
 Botswana Teachers' Union

Education in Botswana 
 Education in Botswana

Botswana educators 
 Patrick van Rensburg
Alinah Kelo Segobye
 Sheila Tlou
 Thomas Tlou

Schools in Botswana 
See List of secondary schools in Botswana
 Maru a Pula School
 Westwood International School

Universities and colleges in Botswana 
 University of Botswana
 St. Joseph's College, Kgale
 Botswana Accountancy College
 Botho University
 Botswana University of Agriculture and Natural Resources
 Botswana International University of Science and Technology
 Institute of Health Services
 Botswana Police College

Fauna of Botswana 
 Aardwolf
 African buffalo
 African civet
 African wild dog
 African striped weasel
 Bat-eared fox
 Black-footed cat
 Bongo (antelope)
 Brown hyena
 Cape fox
 Caracal
 Cheetah
 Dik-dik
 Hippopotamus
 Leopard
 Lion
 Plains zebra
 Queen whydah
 Ratel
 Serval
 Spotted hyena

Geography of Botswana 
 Geography of Botswana
 ISO 3166-2:BW
 Makgadikgadi Pan
 Okavango Delta
 Omuramba
 See also: Mines in Botswana
 See also: National parks of Botswana

Cities in Botswana 
   Kokong
 List of cities in Botswana
 Bobonong
 Eesterus
 Francistown
 Gaborone
 Ghanzi
 Gomare
 Gumare
 Hukuntsi
 Jwaneng
 Kang, Botswana
 Kanye, Botswana
 Kasane
 Khoutsiri
 Letlhakane
 Lobatse, Botswana
 Mahalapye
 Masunga
 Maun, Botswana
 Mochudi
 Mogoditshane
 Molepolole
 Moshupa
 Nojane
 Orapa
 Palapye
 Ramokgwebana
 Ramotswa, Botswana
 Selebi-Phikwe, Botswana
 Serowe
 Shoshong
 Sowa, Botswana
 Thamaga
 Tlokweng
 Tonota
 Toteng
 Tshabong
 Tutume
 Ukwi

Craters of Botswana 
 Kgagodi crater

Dams of Botswana

Deserts of Botswana 
 Kalahari Desert

Districts of Botswana 
 Districts of Botswana
 Central District (Botswana)
 Ghanzi District
 Kgalagadi
 Kgatleng District
 Kweneng District
 North-East District (Botswana)
 North-West District (Botswana)
 South-East District (Botswana)
 Southern District (Botswana)

Lakes of Botswana 
 Lake Ngami

Maps of Botswana 
 Tracks4Africa

Old maps of Botswana 
 Maps of Botswana

Rivers of Botswana 

 Boteti River
 Cuando River
 Khwai River
 Molopo River
 Okavango River
 Thamalakane River

Botswana geography stubs 
 Bobonong
 Boteti River
 Central District (Botswana)
 Central Kalahari Game Reserve
 Cuando River
 Damtshaa diamond mine
 Eesterus
 Ghanzi
 Ghanzi District
 Gomare
 Gumare
 Hukuntsi
 Jwaneng
 Jwaneng diamond mine
 Kang, Botswana
 Kanye, Botswana
 Kasane
 Kgagodi crater
 Kgalagadi
 Kgatleng District
 Khoutsiri
 Khutse Game Reserve
 Khwai River
 Lake Makgadikgadi
 Lake Ngami
 Letlhakane
 Letlhakane diamond mine
 List of national parks of Botswana
 Lobatse, Botswana
 Mahalapye
 Makgadikgadi Pan
 Makgadikgadi Pans National Park
 Masunga
 Mochudi
 Mogoditshane
 Mokolodi Nature Reserve
 Molepolole
 Molopo River
 Moremi Wildlife Reserve
 Nojane
 North-East District (Botswana)
 North-West District (Botswana)
 Nxai Pan National Park
 Omuramba
 Orapa
 Orapa diamond mine
 Palapye
 Ramokgwebana
 Ramotswa, Botswana
 Sankuyo
 Selebi-Phikwe, Botswana
 Serowe
 Sir Seretse Khama International Airport
 South-East District (Botswana)
 Southern District (Botswana)
 Sowa, Botswana
 Tati Concessions Land
 Template:Botswana-geo-stub
 Thamaga
 Thamalakane River
 Tlokweng
 Tonota
 Toteng
 Tshabong
 Tsodilo
 Tutume
 Ukwi

Government of Botswana 
 List of commissioners of Bechuanaland
 Heads of government of Botswana
 Heads of state of Botswana
 Festus Mogae
 Vice-President of Botswana
 Parliamentary constituencies of Botswana
 Ministry of Environment, Natural Resource Conservation and Tourism

Foreign relations of Botswana 
 Foreign relations of Botswana

Botswana diplomats 
 Thomas Tlou

History of Botswana 
 History of Botswana
 Bechuanaland Protectorate
 List of commissioners of Bechuanaland
 Frederick Thomas Green
 Rulers of Balete (baMalete)
 Rulers of Bangwato (bamaNgwato)
 Rulers of baKgatla
 Rulers of baKwêna
 Rulers of baNgwaketse
 Rulers of baRôlông
 Rulers of baTawana
 Rulers of baTlôkwa
 Setshele I
 See also: Archaeological sites in Botswana

Elections in Botswana 
 Elections in Botswana
 Botswana general election, 1969
 Botswana general election, 1974
 Botswana general election, 1979
 Botswana general election, 1984
 Botswana general election, 1989
 Botswana general election, 1994
 Botswana general election, 1999
 Botswana general election, 2004
 Botswana general election, 2009
 Botswana general election, 2014
 Botswana general election, 2019

Military of Botswana 
 Botswana Defence Force
 Botswana Defence Force Air Wing

Organisations based in Botswana 
 The Botswana Scouts Association
 See also: Companies of Botswana
 See also: Schools in Botswana
 See also: Trade unions of Botswana
 See also: Universities and colleges in Botswana

Political parties in Botswana 
 List of political parties in Botswana
 Botswana Alliance Movement
 Botswana Congress Party
 Botswana Democratic Party
 Botswana Independence Party
 Botswana National Front
 Botswana People's Party
 International Socialist Organization (Botswana)
 Marx, Engels, Lenin, Stalin Movement
 New Democratic Front

Botswana people 
 List of Tswana people
 Khama III
 Mpule Kwelagobe
 See also: Botswana-bio-stub

Botswana people by occupation 
 See also: Botswana diplomats
 See also: Botswana educators
 See also: Botswana politicians
 See also: Botswana sportspeople

Botswana writers 
 Caitlin Davies
 Unity Dow
 Bessie Head
 Moteane Melamu
 Patrick van Rensburg
 Barolong Seboni
 Andrew Sesinyi
 Thomas Tlou

 See also: Botswana-writer-stub

Botswana politicians 
 Andrew Sesinyi
 Festus Mogae
 Gaositwe K.T. Chiepe
 Joseph Legwaila
 Lenyeletse Seretse
 Mokgweetsi Masisi
 Mompati Merafhe
 Peter Mmusi
 Quett Masire
 Ruth Williams Khama
 Samuel O. Outlule
 Seretse Khama
 Seretse Ian Khama
 Sheila Tlou
 See also: Botswana-politician-stub

Politics of Botswana 
 Politics of Botswana
 Heads of government of Botswana
 Heads of state of Botswana
 National Assembly of Botswana
 Ntlo ya Dikgosi
 Parliament of Botswana
 Vice-President of Botswana
 See also: Elections in Botswana
 See also: Foreign relations of Botswana
 See also: Political parties in Botswana
 See also: Botswana politicians

Religion in Botswana 
 Christianity in Botswana
 Hinduism in Botswana
 Islam in Botswana
 Roman Catholicism in Botswana

Botswana society 
 Child labour in Botswana
 Demographics of Botswana
 Presidents' Day (Botswana)
 Public holidays in Botswana
 The Botswana Scouts Association
 See also: Languages of Botswana

Ethnic groups in Botswana 
Bakgalagari
Batapo
Baritji
 !Kung people
 Bamangwato
 Bushmen
 Herero
 Lozi people
 Nama people
 Sotho–Tswana
 Tswana

Sport in Botswana 
 Sport in Botswana
 Botswana at the Olympics
 Botswana at the African Games
 Botswana at the Commonwealth Games
 See also: Botswana-sport-stub

Botswana sports people

Botswana athletes 
 Gable Garenamotse
 Kabelo Kgosiemang
 Tlhalosang Molapisi
 California Molefe
 Obakeng Ngwigwa

Botswana boxers 
 Khumiso Ikgopoleng
 Lechedzani Luza
 France Mabiletsa

Botswana footballers 
 Dipsy Selolwane
Thatayaone Mothuba

Olympic competitors for Botswana 
 Gable Garenamotse
 Khumiso Ikgopoleng
 Lechedzani Luza
 France Mabiletsa
 California Molefe
 Nijel Amos

Football in Botswana 
 Football in Botswana
 Botswana Football Association
 Botswana national football team
 List of football clubs in Botswana

Botswana football clubs 
 Botswana Defence Force XI
 Gaborone United
 Mogoditshane Fighters
 Amagents Football Club
 Township Rollers F.C.

Botswana football competitions 
 FA Challenge Cup (Botswana)
 Botswana Premier League
 FA Challenge Cup
 Botswana Independence Cup

Football venues in Botswana 
 Botswana National Stadium

Botswana at the Olympics 
 Botswana at the 1992 Summer Olympics
 Botswana at the 1996 Summer Olympics
 Botswana at the 2000 Summer Olympics
 Botswana at the 2004 Summer Olympics
 Botswana at the 2008 Summer Olympics
 Botswana at the 2012 Summer Olympics
 Botswana at the 2016 Summer Olympics
 Botswana at the 2020 Summer Olympics
 See also: Olympic competitors for Botswana

Marathons of Botswana 
 Gaborone City Marathon

Transport in Botswana 
 Transport in Botswana
 Botswana Railways
 See also: Airports in Botswana

Airlines of Botswana 
 Air Botswana

Botswana stubs 
 Template:Botswana-stub
 Air Botswana Employees' Union
 Andrew Sesinyi
 BLNS Countries
 Badimo
 Barolong Seboni
 Botswana Agricultural Marketing Board Workers' Union
 Botswana Alliance Movement
 Botswana Bank Employees' Union
 Botswana Beverages & Allied Workers' Union
 Botswana Central Bank Staff Union
 Botswana Commercial & General Workers' Union
 Botswana Congress Party
 Botswana Construction Workers' Union
 Botswana Democratic Party
 Botswana Diamond Sorters & Valuators' Union
 Botswana Federation of Trade Unions
 Botswana Football Association
 Botswana Housing Corporation Staff Union
 Botswana Institute for Development Policy Analysis
 Botswana Institute of Development Management Workers' Union
 Botswana Manufacturing & Packaging Workers' Union
 Botswana Meat Industry Workers' Union
 Botswana Mining Workers' Union
 Botswana National Development Bank Staff Union
 Botswana National Front
 Botswana People's Party
 Botswana Postal Services Workers' Union
 Botswana Power Corporation Workers' Union
 Botswana Private Medical & Health Services Workers' Union
 Botswana Railways Amalgamated Workers' Union
 Botswana Saving Bank Employees' Union
 Botswana Telecommunication Employees' Union
 Botswana Vaccine Institute Staff Union
 Botswana Wholesale, Furniture & Retail Workers' Union
 Botswana at the 1992 Summer Olympics
 Botswana at the 1996 Summer Olympics
 Botswana at the 2000 Summer Olympics
 Botswana at the 2006 Commonwealth Games
 California Molefe
 Caterplus Botswana (Pty) Ltd
 International Socialist Organization (Botswana)
 Islam in Botswana
 Joseph Legwaila
 Kgotla
 Khumiso Ikgopoleng
 Lechedzani Luza
 Lenyeletse Seretse
 Mmegi
 Moses Tito Kachima
 Moteane Melamu
 National Amalgamated Central, Local & Parastatal Manual Workers' Union
 Parliament of Botswana
 Permanent Representatives' Committee of the African Union
 Peter Mmusi
 Presidents' Day (Botswana)
 Roman Catholicism in Botswana
 Rural Industry Promotions Company Workers' Union
 University of Botswana Non-Academic Staff Union
 See also: Botswana geography stubs

See also 
 Lists of country-related topics - similar lists for other countries

Botswana-related lists